Drăgușenii Noi is a commune in Hînceşti District, Moldova. It is composed of two villages, Drăgușenii Noi and Horodca.

References

Communes of Hîncești District